Leonardo Santos Cordeiro (born 8 November 1989 in São José dos Campos) is a Brazilian racing driver.

Career

Karting
Cordeiro made his karting debut in 2003, at the age of 13. In 2004 and 2005, Cordeiro became Champion of the Petrobrás Smile Cup. In 2006 and 2007, he was runner-up in the Brazilian championship.

Formula Three
Cordeiro began his single seater career in 2007 in the Formula Three Sudamericana championship. Driving for Lecor Sports, Cordeiro finished seventeenth in the championship, taking one podium finish at Interlagos.

Cordeiro remained in the series for 2008 but switched to Cesario Fórmula. He improved to fifth in the standings with one win at Piriápolis.

For 2009, Cordeiro remained in the championship with Cesario Fórmula. He won ten of the eighteen races he competed, and became champion by 40 points ahead of compatriot Claudio Cantelli.

GP3 Series
2010 saw Cordeiro move to the GP3 Series, competing for MW Arden, the team that is backed by Red Bull Racing's Mark Webber. He joined Michael Christensen and Miquel Monrás at the team.

Racing record

Career summary

 Season still in progress.

Complete GP3 Series results
(key) (Races in bold indicate pole position) (Races in italics indicate fastest lap)

* Season still in progress

References

External links
 Official site 
 Cordeiro career statistics at Driver Database

1989 births
Living people
People from São José dos Campos
Brazilian GP3 Series drivers
Formula 3 Sudamericana drivers
Carlin racing drivers
Arden International drivers
Sportspeople from São Paulo (state)